Parablechnum is a genus of ferns in the family Blechnaceae, subfamily Blechnoideae, according to the Pteridophyte Phylogeny Group classification of 2016 (PPG I). The genus is accepted in a 2016 classification of the family Blechnaceae, but other sources sink it into a very broadly defined Blechnum, equivalent to the whole of the PPG I subfamily.

Species
, using the PPG I classification system, the Checklist of Ferns and Lycophytes of the World accepted the following species:

Parablechnum acanthopodum (T.C.Chambers & P.A.Farrant) Gasper & Salino
Parablechnum ambiguum (Kaulf. ex C.Presl) C.Presl
Parablechnum articulatum (F.Muell.) Gasper & Salino
Parablechnum atropurpureum (A.R.Sm.) Gasper & Salino
Parablechnum bicolor (M.Kessler & A.R.Sm.) Gasper & Salino
Parablechnum bolivianum (M.Kessler & A.R.Sm.) Gasper & Salino
Parablechnum camfieldii (Tindale) Gasper & Salino
Parablechnum capense (Burm. fil.) Gasper & Salino
Parablechnum chauliodontum (Copel.) Gasper & Salino
Parablechnum chiriquanum (Broadh.) Gasper & Salino
Parablechnum christii (C.Chr.) Gasper & Salino
Parablechnum cochabambense (M.Kessler & A.R.Sm.) Gasper & Salino
Parablechnum confusum (E.Fourn.) Gasper & Salino
Parablechnum corbassonii (Brownlie) Gasper & Salino
Parablechnum cordatum (Desv.) Gasper & Salino
Parablechnum dilatatum (T.C.Chambers & P.A.Farrant) Gasper & Salino
Parablechnum falciforme (Liebm.) Gasper & Salino
Parablechnum gemmascens (Alston) Gasper & Salino
Parablechnum glaziovii (Christ) Gasper & Salino
Parablechnum gregsonii (Tindale) Gasper & Salino
Parablechnum hieronymi (Brause) Gasper & Salino
Parablechnum howeanum (T.C.Chambers & P.A.Farrant) Gasper & Salino
Parablechnum lechleri (Mett.) Gasper & Salino
Parablechnum lima (Rosenst.) Gasper & Salino
Parablechnum lineatum (Sw.) Gasper & Salino
Parablechnum longistipitatum (A.Rojas) comb. ined.
Parablechnum loxense (Kunth) Gasper & Salino
Parablechnum marginatum (Fée) Gasper & Salino
Parablechnum milnei (Carruth.) Gasper & Salino
Parablechnum minus (R.Br.) Gasper & Salino
Parablechnum monomorphum (R.C.Moran & B. Øllg.) Gasper & Salino
Parablechnum montanum (T.C.Chambers & P.A.Farrant) Gasper & Salino
Parablechnum moranianum (A.Rojas) Gasper & Salino
Parablechnum nesophilum (T.C.Chambers & P.A.Farrant) Gasper & Salino
Parablechnum novae-zelandiae (T.C.Chambers & P.A.Farrant) Gasper & Salino
Parablechnum obtusum (R.C.Moran & A.R.Sm.) Gasper & Salino
Parablechnum pacificum (Lorence & A.R.Sm.) Gasper & Salino
Parablechnum paucipinna A.R.Sm.
Parablechnum pazense (M.Kessler & A.R.Sm.) Gasper & Salino
Parablechnum procerum (G.Forst.) C.Presl
Parablechnum proliferum (Rosenst.) Gasper & Salino
Parablechnum puniceum (T.C.Chambers, P.J.Edwards & R.J.Johns) Gasper & Salino
Parablechnum reflexum (Rosenst. ex M.Kessler & A.R.Sm.) Gasper & Salino
Parablechnum repens (M.Kessler & A.R.Sm.) Gasper & Salino
Parablechnum revolutum (Alderw.) Gasper & Salino
Parablechnum rheophyticum (R.C.Moran) Gasper & Salino
Parablechnum roraimense V.A.O.Dittrich & Gasper
Parablechnum ryanii (Kaulf.) Gasper & Salino
Parablechnum schiedeanum (Schltdl. ex C.Presl) Gasper & Salino
Parablechnum sessilifolium (Klotzsch ex Christ) Gasper & Salino
Parablechnum smilodon (M.Kessler & Lehnert) Gasper & Salino
Parablechnum squamatum (M.Kessler & A.R.Sm.) Gasper & Salino
Parablechnum squamosissimum (A.Rojas) Gasper & Salino
Parablechnum stipitellatum (Sodiro) Gasper & Salino
Parablechnum stuebelii (Hieron.) Gasper & Salino
Parablechnum subcordatum (E.Fourn.) Gasper & Salino
Parablechnum triangularifolium (T.C.Chambers & P.A.Farrant) Gasper & Salino
Parablechnum tuerckheimii (Brause) Gasper & Salino
Parablechnum usterianum (Christ) Gasper & Salino
Parablechnum venosum (Copel.) Gasper & Salino
Parablechnum vestitum (Blume) Gasper & Salino
Parablechnum wattsii (Tindale) Gasper & Salino
Parablechnum werffii (R.C.Moran) Gasper & Salino
Parablechnum wohlgemuthii M.Kessler & A.R.Sm.
Parablechnum wurunuran (Parris) Gasper & Salino

References

Blechnaceae
Fern genera